The 2023 Malaysia Open (officially known as the Petronas Malaysia Open 2023 for sponsorship reasons) was a badminton tournament that took place at the Axiata Arena, Kuala Lumpur, Malaysia, from 10 to 15 January 2023 and had a total prize of US$1,250,000. This was the first Malaysia Open to hold a Super 1000 status.

Tournament
The 2023 Malaysia Open was the first tournament of the 2023 BWF World Tour and was part of the Malaysia Open championships, which had been held since 1937. This tournament was organized by the Badminton Association of Malaysia with sanction from the BWF.

Venue
This tournament was held at the Axiata Arena inside the KL Sports City in Kuala Lumpur, Malaysia.

Point distribution
Below is the point distribution table for each phase of the tournament based on the BWF points system for the BWF World Tour Super 1000 event.

Prize pool
The total prize money was US$1,250,000 with the distribution of the prize money in accordance with BWF regulations.

Men's singles

Seeds 

 Viktor Axelsen (champion)
 Lee Zii Jia (first round)
 Loh Kean Yew (quarter-finals)
 Chou Tien-chen (second round)
 Jonatan Christie (second round)
 Anthony Sinisuka Ginting (quarter-finals)
 Lakshya Sen (first round)
 Kunlavut Vitidsarn (semi-finals)

Finals

Top half

Section 1

Section 2

Bottom half

Section 3

Section 4

Women's singles

Seeds 

 Akane Yamaguchi (champion)
 An Se-young (final)
 Tai Tzu-ying (semi-finals)
 Chen Yufei (semi-finals)
 He Bingjiao (first round)
 P. V. Sindhu (first round)
 Ratchanok Intanon (withdrew)
 Wang Zhiyi (quarter-finals)

Finals

Top half

Section 1

Section 2

Bottom half

Section 3

Section 4

Men's doubles

Seeds 

 Takuro Hoki / Yugo Kobayashi (first round)
 Marcus Fernaldi Gideon / Kevin Sanjaya Sukamuljo (second round)
 Fajar Alfian / Muhammad Rian Ardianto (champions)
 Aaron Chia / Soh Wooi Yik (second round)
 Mohammad Ahsan / Hendra Setiawan (quarter-finals)
 Kim Astrup / Anders Skaarup Rasmussen (quarter-finals)
 Satwiksairaj Rankireddy / Chirag Shetty (semi-finals)
 Ong Yew Sin / Teo Ee Yi (quarter-finals)

Finals

Top half

Section 1

Section 2

Bottom half

Section 3

Section 4

Women's doubles

Seeds 

 Chen Qingchen / Jia Yifan (champions)
 Nami Matsuyama / Chiharu Shida (withdrew)
 Kim So-yeong / Kong Hee-yong (quarter-finals)
 Lee So-hee / Shin Seung-chan (first round)
 Jeong Na-eun / Kim Hye-jeong (second round)
 Jongkolphan Kititharakul / Rawinda Prajongjai (first round)
 Zhang Shuxian / Zheng Yu (semi-finals)
 Pearly Tan / Thinaah Muralitharan (first round)

Finals

Top half

Section 1

Section 2

Bottom half

Section 3

Section 4

Mixed doubles

Seeds 

 Zheng Siwei / Huang Yaqiong (champions)
 Dechapol Puavaranukroh / Sapsiree Taerattanachai (semi-finals)
 Yuta Watanabe / Arisa Higashino (final)
 Wang Yilyu / Huang Dongping (second round)
 Tang Chun Man / Tse Ying Suet (second round)
 Tan Kian Meng / Lai Pei Jing (first round)
 Seo Seung-jae / Chae Yoo-jung (quarter-finals)
 Thom Gicquel / Delphine Delrue (quarter-finals)

Finals

Top half

Section 1

Section 2

Bottom half

Section 3

Section 4

References

External links
 Tournament Link

Malaysia Open (badminton)
Malaysia Open
Malaysia Open
Malaysia Open